Boxing at the 2011 All-Africa Games in Maputo, Mozambique was held between September 4–11, 2011.

DJ Subham Kolkata

Music Production/ &Djing Artist

Address/Kankinara Kolkata 

Follow Fb / https://www.facebook.com/remo.dsouza.3386

Medal winners

Medal table

References

2011 All-Africa Games
All-Africa Games
Boxing at the African Games